Freddie Parker (born July 6, 1962) is an American former running back in the National Football League.

Biography
Parker was born on July 6, 1962 in Heidelberg, Mississippi.

Career
Parker was a member of the Green Bay Packers during the 1987 NFL season. He played at the collegiate level at Mississippi Valley State University.

See also
List of Green Bay Packers players

References

1962 births
Living people
People from Jasper County, Mississippi
Players of American football from Mississippi
Green Bay Packers players
American football running backs
Mississippi Valley State Delta Devils football players